She-Ra and the Princesses of Power is an American animated streaming television series developed for Netflix by ND Stevenson and produced by DreamWorks Animation Television. Like the 1985 Filmation series She-Ra: Princess of Power, of which it is a reboot, She-Ra and the Princesses of Power tells the tale of Adora, an adolescent who can transform into the heroine She-Ra and leads a group of other magical princesses in a rebellion against the evil Lord Hordak and his Horde. 

She-Ra and the Princesses of Power received critical acclaim, with particular praise for its diverse cast and the complex relationship between She-Ra and her best friend-turned-archenemy Catra. In 2019, the show was nominated for a GLAAD Media Award for Outstanding Kids & Family Programming, as well as a Daytime Emmy Award at the 46th Daytime Emmy Awards. In 2021, the series was tied with First Day when it won the GLAAD Media Award for Outstanding Kids and Family Programming.

On linear TV, the show previously aired on CBBC in the United Kingdom, before it moved to Pop on January 30, 2023.

Synopsis

She-Ra and the Princesses of Power is set on the planet Etheria and follows the stories of Adora and Catra, orphans who were raised to be soldiers in the Horde. They are part of an evil army led by Hordak, a tyrannical despot who dreams of conquering the planet. One day, after getting lost in the woods, Adora finds a magic sword that transforms her into the legendary Princess of Power, She-Ra. After learning that the Horde is actually evil and has been inflicting suffering on Etheria and its inhabitants, Adora decides to join the Rebellion in the fight against the Horde. She helps rebuild the Princess Alliance, a league of kingdoms ruled by other magical princesses. Adora's newfound allegiance to the Rebellion pits her against Catra, her former best friend, whose feelings of betrayal and abandonment twist her personal ambitions and lead her to become Adora's mortal enemy. Much of the show centers around their conflict.

In the first season, Adora helps reassemble the Princess Alliance, which successfully defends the rebel stronghold of Bright Moon against the Horde's assault. Meanwhile, Catra rises in the ranks to become Hordak's second-in-command.

In the second and third seasons, Hordak attempts to build an interdimensional portal which will allow him to contact his creator, the interplanetary warlord Horde Prime. Catra activates the portal even though it threatens to tear the planet apart, and rebellion leader Queen Angella sacrifices herself to stop it.

In the fourth season, friction arises between Adora and her friend Glimmer (Angella's daughter and the new queen of Bright Moon) when Adora learns that her sword is the key to an ancient superweapon inside Etheria. In order to prevent the weapon from activating, Adora destroys her sword, losing access to her She-Ra powers, but not before Etheria is pulled through a portal, becoming vulnerable to attack by Horde Prime's armada.

The fifth and final season follows Adora's journey to liberate Etheria from Horde Prime's reign. Adora rescues a redeemed Catra and Glimmer from Horde Prime, discovering her innate She-Ra powers in the process, but in the meantime Horde Prime has subdued much of Etheria with his mind-control capabilities. The princesses and Catra work together to disable Horde Prime's hivemind and stop him from accessing Etheria's ancient superweapon. In the end, it is Adora and Catra's love for each other that enables She-Ra to destroy both the weapon and Horde Prime, and save the universe from his tyrannical reign.

Cast and characters

 Aimee Carrero as Adora / She-Ra
 LaLa Nestor as young Adora
 AJ Michalka as Catra
 Juliet Donenfeld as young Catra
 Karen Fukuhara as Glimmer, Princess of Bright Moon
 Marcus Scribner as Bow
 Reshma Shetty as Angella, Queen of Bright Moon
 Lorraine Toussaint as Shadow Weaver
 Keston John as Hordak, Horde Prime, Grizzlor, Admiral Scurvy, Wrong Hordak, Horde Sergeant, Horde clones
 Lauren Ash as Scorpia, Princess of the Fright Zone
 Christine Woods as Entrapta, Princess of Dryl
 Genesis Rodriguez as Perfuma, Princess of Plumeria
 Jordan Fisher as Sea Hawk, Seneschal, and Soda Pop
 Vella Lovell as Mermista, Princess of Salineas
 Merit Leighton as Frosta, Princess of the Kingdom of Snows
 Sandra Oh as Castaspella, sorcerer of Mystacor
 Krystal Joy Brown as Netossa, rebel princess
 ND Stevenson as Spinnerella, rebel princess, and Serenia
 Morla Gorrondona as Light Hope
 Grey Griffin as Razz
 Adam Ray as Swift Wind
 Geena Davis as Huntara
 Zehra Fazal as Mara
 Chris Jai Alex as George, one of Bow's fathers
 Regi Davis as Lance, one of Bow's fathers
 Dana Davis as Lonnie
 Antony Del Rio as Kyle
 Daniel Dae Kim as Micah, King of Bright Moon
 Taylor Gray as young Micah
 Jake Eberle as Norwyn and Tung Lashor
 Jacob Tobia as Double Trouble
 Amanda C. Miller as Flutterina
 Amy Landecker as Octavia
 Alex Blue Davis as Jewelstar
 Ashley Eckstein as Tallstar
 Melissa Fumero as Starla
 John Lavelle as Peekablue

Production

Development
Development and production of the series began concurrently in April 2016. It was announced on December 12, 2017. Showrunner ND Stevenson initially pitched it to Netflix on the assumption of creating only one season, but in November 2018, he explained that "we now have four arcs of 13 episodes done". She-Ra is created using traditional animation, with the exception of some computer animation for "complicated machinery". The animation is provided by South Korean studio NE4U.

Themes
The first season of the serialized She-Ra reboot focuses on establishing the characters and their relationships in order to set up future seasons, initially by way of a "mission-of-the-week" plot to have the core cast of Adora and her close friends, Glimmer and Bow recruit princesses to their rebellion. While the core premise and characters of the original series were carried over, as well as many of its affectations (such as Adora's transformation catchphrase "For the honor of Grayskull!"), the reboot sets itself apart from the 1980s series by its almost entirely female cast. The characters were made to be deliberately diverse, both in regard to appearance as well as character traits. For instance, some characters range from good to "evil but understandable", "utterly amoral" or "full-blown hippie". He-Man, who in the original version was She-Ra's brother who "awakens her destiny", does not appear in the reboot, in order to set up She-Ra as a hero in her own right.

According to Stevenson, the show's thematic core is the relationships among its characters, which range from "wide-eyed love" to "heart-rending jealousy, crushes and infatuations". Reviewers particularly highlighted the convincing portrayal of the anti-hero Catra and her complicated "frenemy" relationship with Adora, which The Verge described as "the best animated antihero story since Avatar: The Last Airbender's Zuko". In addition, the series addresses such themes as abusive relationships and overcoming trauma, prejudice, isolationism (as exemplified, initially, by the princesses), colonization, imperialism, and genocide (a result of Hordak's planetary-scale warfare). There is a strong focus on the struggle to break free of sociopolitical indoctrination, explored mainly through the stories of Adora, Hordak, and Light Hope. The series also emphasizes the necessity of taking action no matter one's own power or circumstances; it portrays magic as fallible and dependent on its wielder's skill and determination—Adora's powers in particular are directly tied to her love for her friends. Despite this, Adora's main internal conflict stems from being told she must suppress her personal desires in order to be the hero Etheria needs. Finally, Horde Prime's regime in Season 5 contains elements reminiscent of fundamentalist Christianity, which Stevenson has noted are not meant to be criticisms of religion itself but rather the kind of leadership seen in extremist, cult-like organizations.

In June 2020, Stevenson said that Catra was a woman of color, saying he discussed her "being a brown Latina" when designing her, although this was not "explicitly, textually present in the show," Stevenson also expressed enthusiasm for fans interpreting Catra as representing Persian ethnicity.

Influences
Stevenson cited Steven Universe as a series that paved the way for She-Ra, saying his early conversations about queer relationships and characters in She-Ra were only possible because of Steven Universe. In another interview, he implied influence of Steven Universe on the show. He noted that the crew wanted to introduce Catra's pink lion Clawdeen, from the original She-Ra series, into his series, but decided to not do so because its design was "pretty much identical" to Steven Universes Lion. As a result, he chose Melog as a "therapy animal" for Catra instead. Stevenson also noted the importance of featuring LGBTQ+ representation in kids animation, saying earlier shows made She-Ra's "range of queer representation" possible.

The show was also influenced by sci-fi in the 1970s and 1980s, paying homage to the original She-Ra: Princess of Power show, and Dungeons & Dragons. Stevenson called the show basically a D&D campaign, with Adora, Glimmer, and Bow falling into "specific classes in D&D." Additionally, Stevenson and the show's crew were strongly influenced by anime, especially those with magical girls.

LGBT representation

The creators indicated prior to release that the series would provide LGBT representation. Tor.com commented that the series "reads as utterly queer in just about every aspect", with many characters coded as fluid in terms of gender or sexuality, and none as clearly heterosexual. Stevenson said that when a network executive asked what the rainbow in the climax of the first season's finale meant, he replied: "The gay agenda". In March 2021, Stevenson told Vanity Fair that early in the show's run there "had to be plausible deniability" around most queer relationships, but this changed once he got "positive, vocal support from fans of the show" who picked up on queer subtext and wanted more. This enabled Stevenson to sell executives on the idea that the "queer relationship between the two leads [was] to be the climax of the entire show."

The relationship between Adora and Catra has undercurrents of romantic tension from the beginning of the series, and concludes with a mutual confession of love and an on-screen kiss in the final episode. The scene has been regarded as a revolutionary moment in the history of children's media and LGBT representation. Other reviews praised 
the "queer romance" manifested by the Adora-Catra relationship and said that this slow-burn romance was a groundbreaking moment for TV.

The series features same-sex attraction and romance among secondary and side characters as well. The romantic relationship between two female side characters, Spinnerella and Netossa, appears beginning in the first season, and receives more attention in a plot arc in the fifth season when Netossa must rescue her wife from the villain's mind control. The second season introduces a gay couple, Bow's fathers Lance and George. Additionally, it is strongly implied that Scorpia, Catra's right-hand through most of the series, has feelings for Catra and goes on pseudo-dates "disguised as side missions." In August 2020, Stevenson stated on Twitter that the characters Light Hope and Mara were in love in the series's backstory.

In addition to queer romantic relationships, the series also features diverse gender identities. The fourth season introduced Double Trouble, a non-binary character who uses the singular they pronoun and is voiced by the non-binary actor and writer Jacob Tobia. Character designer Ray Geiger said that the character Jewelstar, featured in the fifth season and voiced by the transgender actor Alex Blue Davis, is a transgender man. Geiger also said that they intended for Adora's ally Perfuma to be read as a trans woman, though this is not acknowledged in the show.

In June 2021, Stevenson told Insider that while the show's staff had a "good number of trans and nonbinary crew," criticism from some of Double Trouble as a villain and a "nonbinary character whose gender nonconformity was conflated with...alienness," blindsided him, admitting he "might have done some things differently," had he known of this perspective. He also said this conversation was important because "it points to the limits of our imagination." Tobia also told the publication that non-binary representation on screen needs to reflect the diversity of the non-binary community and make a statement to viewers in the process.

Staff and cast

The series' showrunner and creator is ND Stevenson, a cartoonist who became known for their Eisner Award-winning comics Nimona and Lumberjanes. During the development and airing of the series, they used the name Noelle Stevenson. The principal voice cast includes Aimee Carrero as She-Ra, AJ Michalka as Catra, Karen Fukuhara as Glimmer,  and Marcus Scribner as Bow. Mary Elizabeth McGlynn is the voice director. The series has an all-female writers' room, and only one man in the regular voice cast. Around 45 people worked on She-Ra in the DreamWorks offices in Glendale.

Design
Visually, the rebooted She-Ra series takes inspiration from anime and the works of Hayao Miyazaki and Moebius. Whereas the original series' heroines were all of exactly the same size and shape to facilitate animation and toy production, and were all white (with the late exception of Netossa), the new series' characters are intentionally diverse in shape and ethnicity.

Character design

After first images of She-Ra's design were released in July 2018, controversy ensued on social media. Some Internet users contended that she was not as "beautiful and sexy", voluptuous or glamorous as in the original series, or that she looked like a boy. Other users responded that the new series tried to avoid sexualizing a children's show, and conveyed body positivity.

J. Michael Straczynski, the co-creator of the original series, commented that his She-Ra was written as "a warrior, first and foremost", and that "anyone who is looking back at [her] as the 'ideal woman' is doing so through the lens of prepubescent ... interest and kind of, understandably, imprinted on her like baby ducks. I get it. But that wasn't the creative intent." Fan artists, mostly young women inspired by the new design's detractors to improve the new character's profile and her reputation, responded to She-Ra's redesign and the controversy over it with a wave of artworks celebrating the heroine's new look.

Music
The series' title song is "Warriors" by Aaliyah Rose. The Washington Post highlighted it as one of the "theme song/opening credits so good it must not be skipped, right up there with Daredevil, The Crown and Narcos".

The soundtrack was composed by Sunna Wehrmeijer. She aimed at creating a "contemporary '80s synth-sound combined with orchestral adventure", based on the creators' desire to feature "big and epic" but also "sparkly" music. A soundtrack album was released to the public May 8, 2020 and included a cover of the theme song by AJ Michalka.

Broadcast and promotion

Episodes

Promotion
A first teaser trailer released in September 2018 showcased Adora's transformation into She-Ra. Longer trailers were released in October and November 2018. On January 24, 2019, the network announced the series' renewal for a second season, which debuted on April 26 of that year. A third season was released on August 2, 2019. The fourth season was released on November 5, 2019. The fifth and final season was released on May 15, 2020.

As a novelty for a television series, the series' website is available in a virtual reality format, and is set up to present the user with a virtual crystal palace.

Reception

Critical response
While Metacritic has not assigned the series a weighted average score, it has given all six reviews by mainstream critics a score of an 80 or above out of 100.

The first season received critical acclaim, with the review aggregator Rotten Tomatoes reporting a 100% approval rating based on 24 reviews, with an average rating of 7.66/10. The site's critical consensus reads: "By the grace of Greyskull, [the first season of] She-Ra and the Princesses of Power packs a powerful visual punch that hits even harder thanks to layered writing and multidimensional characters – the perfect show for seasoned fans and little ones alike." Some stated that the series had a lot in common with shows such as Avatar: The Last Airbender, Steven Universe and Sailor Moon, including characters who "read fluidly on the gender and sexuality spectrum." Vox called the series one of the "most LGBTQ-inclusive and diverse shows on television."

Entertainment Weeklys Darren Franich described the series as "a funny-wonderful pop fantasy animated like disco fireworks, fun for kids of all genders and any parents looking for something happy to cry about". Franich appreciated the self-aware humor and "hiply transgressive newness". Franich also noted some repetition, occasionally flat animation and the final showdown's predictable outcome. He found some of the tension in contemporary American politics reflected in the series' portrayal of the rebuilding of a "coalition of powerful liberal-minded thinkers left in disarray after a brutal defeat years ago by a monstrously all-consuming bad dude". Collider called the series "visually exciting, emotionally charged, and unexpectedly hilarious", and "one of the best new shows of the year". David Griffin at IGN praised the series for successfully rebooting the franchise but concluded that "Adora could have used more time with the Horde to help develop her character".

Hypable praised the series' diversity and the multifaceted relationships among some of its core characters, but found much of the first season's plot "simplistic", and the rotating cast of princesses given short shrift. The Washington Post highlighted the "top-notch" voice cast and particularly the work of Lorraine Toussaint as the sorceress Shadow Weaver. The Verge commented that the series' biggest problem was that it was "retreading territory that Steven Universe and the two Avatar animated series did better", with several characters and plot points heavily reminiscent of elements from these earlier animated series, and also criticized the early episodes' shallow plot. Tor.com's Maya Gittleman stated that the show not only "queers fantasy archetypes" but has a "deliberately inclusive, [and] diverse cast," works to highlight "different means of expressing power," and have room for "an expansive exploration of femininity." Gittleman further argued that the show operates further "outside the gender binary" than any show she knows of, that "Catradora has actually been canon for years" with the show focusing on a world where "the love of two queer girls gets to save the universe." In the end of her review, she says she would like to see more diverse "queer stories" in the years to come.

The second season has an 85% approval rating on Rotten Tomatoes, based on 13 reviews, with an average rating of 7.84/10. The site's critical consensus reads, "She-Ra and the Princesses of Power continues to go from strength to strength with ebullient flair in a second season that will enrapture younger fans while reminding adult viewers about the virtues of friendship and kindness."

The third season has a 100% approval rating on Rotten Tomatoes, based on 9 reviews, with an average rating of 8/10.

The fourth season has a 100% approval rating on Rotten Tomatoes, based on 11 reviews, with an average rating of 8.58/10.

The fifth and final season has a 100% approval rating on Rotten Tomatoes, based on 13 reviews, with an average rating of 9/10. Raina Deerwater of GLAAD stated that the center of the show is a "relationship between two women" (Adora and Catra), with the dynamic between them driving the entire series, comparing the show to Killing Eve while noting shows like The Legend of Korra,  Adventure Time, and Steven Universe. The Mary Sue stated that the show's final season hammers home the message of love, compassion, and strength, even with an emphasis on forgiveness and allowing those who wish to be redeemed the space to change, like Steven Universe. Paper Magazine argued that the show was carrying the torch from Steven Universe and said that the show tackles various topics like identity, responsibility, "importance of chosen family," and being queer itself. Forbes praised the series on its character development, plotlines, redemption arc for Catra, the screen time for Entrapta, hilarious moments, the interactions between Netossa and Spinnerella, and wrapping up existing character arcs. The A.V. Club said that the sendoff of the series is satisfying, with Catra portrayed as a victim of trauma, with the message that nothing can overpower "the collective power of friendship, love, and solid storytelling." PinkNews called the 
final season "packed with big queer energy" while Digital Spy said that the kiss between Adora and Catra would change TV forever. Three reviewers for Autostraddle called the final season a "literally perfect season of television." Tracy Brown of the Los Angeles Times said that the show lets all kids, especially those who are queer, realize that "being honest about their feelings can make them a hero is as exciting as it is important." Emmet Asher-Perrin on Tor.com, in their review, argued that Catra has an inferiority complex like Loki in the Marvel Cinematic Universe films and the current incarnation of The Master in the Doctor Who series. A.H. Starlyng of the LA Times said that the show's final season is the best in the show, including a redemption arc for Catra, with Adora trying to help Catra become a better person.

Awards and nominations

Legacy and influence
When talking with Entertainment Weekly in May 2020, Stevenson said that he hoped that She-Ra would continue to pave the way, saying he hoped it will be easier to have "romances and relationships that are constant throughout the show" without it taking suspense out of the show itself.

In a New York Times profile on July 21, 2020, climate activist Jamie Margolin said she watched all five seasons of the show over a three-day period, telling the interview, "I was like, I hate the real world. I want to live on Etheria".

Notes

References

External links
 Official website at DreamWorksTV
 Official website at Netflix
 

2010s American animated television series
2010s American comedy-drama television series
2010s American comic science fiction television series
2010s American LGBT-related animated television series
2018 American television series debuts
2020 American television series endings
2020s American animated television series
2020s American comedy-drama television series
2020s American comic science fiction television series
2020s American LGBT-related animated television series
American LGBT-related animated television series
American children's animated action television series
American children's animated comic science fiction television series
American children's animated drama television series
American children's animated science fantasy television series
American children's animated space adventure television series
American children's animated superhero television series
American children's animated supernatural television series
Animated superheroine television shows
Animated television series about extraterrestrial life
Animated television series about orphans
Animated television series reboots
Anime-influenced Western animated television series
BBC children's television shows
English-language Netflix original programming
Fiction about intergalactic travel
Fiction about mind control
Fiction about rebellions
LGBT speculative fiction television series
Magical girl television series
Masters of the Universe television series
Netflix children's programming
Planetary romances
Princess of Power
Teen animated television series
Teen superhero television series
Television series about princesses
Television series by DreamWorks Animation
Television series by Mattel Creations
Television series by Universal Television
Television series set on fictional planets
Television shows about rebels
Television shows based on Mattel toys
Works about women in war